Roland Böse (born 10 February 1947) is a German rower who represented West Germany.

At the 1967 European Rowing Championships in Vichy, Böse won gold with the men's eight. He competed at the 1968 Summer Olympics in Mexico City with the men's eight where they won gold; he started in heat 1 only.

References

1947 births
Living people
German male rowers
Olympic rowers of West Germany
Rowers at the 1968 Summer Olympics
People from Bingen am Rhein
European Rowing Championships medalists
Sportspeople from Rhineland-Palatinate